Marie Cecilia Dalman Eek (born 1960) is a Swedish politician and former member of the Riksdag, the national legislature. A member of the Social Democratic Party, she represented Gothenburg Municipality between October 2012 and September 2014. She is a member of the Council of Europe's Chamber of Regions.

References

1960 births
21st-century Swedish women politicians
Living people
Members of the Riksdag 2010–2014
Members of the Riksdag from the Social Democrats
Women members of the Riksdag